George Blyth (died 1581), of Cambridge and London and York, was an English politician.

He was a Member (MP) of the Parliament of England for Huntingdon in 1563; Maldon in 1571 and Dunheved in 1572.

References

Year of birth missing
1581 deaths
English MPs 1563–1567
English MPs 1571
English MPs 1572–1583
Members of Parliament for Maldon